Cocido lebaniego is a traditional dish from the region of Liébana in Cantabria, Spain. This stew has some essential ingredients, which include chickpeas from the municipality of Potes, potatoes and collard greens (nowadays cabbage is sometimes substituted for the collard greens). The rest of the elements of this recipe are known as compangu, which refers to meat from the pig slaughter, such as bacon (tocino), black pudding (morcilla), chorizo and ham. Another additional ingredient is beef, especially cecina, bones and a stuffing made of bread flour, egg, chorizo and parsley.

Characteristics
This dish is very rich and has great nutritional value. Therefore, it is eaten as a main dish. The soup is enjoyed first, then the chickpeas (occasionally with lettuce) and finally the meat with the stuffing, although sometimes the chickpeas and meat are served together.

See also
List of stews
 Cocido madrileño
 Cocido montañés
 Cozido à portuguesa

Lebaniego
Cantabrian cuisine
Chickpea dishes